The Bubnoff unit (abbreviated B) is a unit of speed equal to . In other words, 1 B is equal to 1 meter in 1,000,000 years, 1 millimeter in 1,000 years, or one micrometer per year. It was defined in 1969.

The Bubnoff unit is employed in geology to measure rates of lowering of earth surfaces due to erosion and is named after the Russian (German-Baltic) geologist Serge von Bubnoff (1888–1957). An erosion speed of 1 B also means that 1 m3 of earth is being removed from an area of 1 km2 in 1 year. Compared to everyday phenomena, erosion is under most circumstances (excluding rapid events like landslides) an extremely slow process, calling for such a specialized unit. For instance, the current average rate of erosion over the Earth's landmasses has been estimated at 30 B (30 m in a million years). There are, however, great regional differences in erosion speed. As an extreme example, the watershed area of the Semani River in Albania is eroding at a rate of almost 3000 B (3 millimeters per year), the river having been estimated to transport about 4600 tons of earth per year from the average square kilometer in its watershed.

The Bubnoff unit was introduced because of a desire for a standard unit to replace the multitude of units in use, such as feet per year, centimeters per year, meters per decade, and so on. One criticism leveled was that by introducing the Bubnoff unit, it would obscure the rate of erosion behind a unit no one besides specialists understood.

1 m/s is equal to approximately 31,540,000,000,000 B.

References

Non-SI metric units
Units of velocity
Geomorphology